Anton Sanko is a composer, orchestrator and producer born in New York City. He has been writing music for films since 1991.

He scored Ouija for Blumhouse/Universal, Jessabelle for Blumhouse/Lionsgate, and Visions, also for Blumhouse/Universal. He is working on The Naturalist for PBS.

Life and career
Sanko’s prominent production credits include producing and writing with Suzanne Vega on Solitude Standing and Days of Open Hand, and producing and writing on Jim Carroll’s last album Pools of Mercury. He has also produced Lucy Kaplansky, Anna Domino and Skeleton Key.

Sanko has composed for many TV series and documentaries, notably the score for Big Love, Masters of Horror, and the epic seven-part global programming television event Great Migrations for National Geographic which aired on the National Geographic Channel in November 2010.

Sanko's first film that he composed was the 1991 HBO TV-movie Women & Men 2. More notable film scores that Sanko is responsible for include the 2012 horror film The Possession, 2013's Nurse 3D, and 2014's Ouija.

He resides in Los Angeles.

Selected filmography
Composer
 Love Always (1996)
 Before Women Had Wings (TV Movie) (1997)
 Strangeland (1998)
 Saving Face (2004)
 Masters of Horror (TV Series) (2006) (1 episode)
 Fab Five: The Texas Cheerleader Scandal (TV Movie) (2008)
 Handsome Harry (2009)
 Big Love (2009-2011)
 Rabbit Hole (2010)
 Great Migrations (TV Mini-series) (2010) 
 The Possession (2012)
 Nurse 3D (2013)
 Ouija (2014)
 The Devil's Hand (2014)
 Jessabelle (2014)
 Visions (2015)
 Big Bear (2017)
 The Drowning (2016)
 Jackals (2017)
 The Seagull (2018) - with Nico Muhly
 Amanda (2018)
 Fractured (2019)
 The Half of It (2020)
 The Boy Behind the Door (2020)
 Outside the Law (1920) - rescored in 2021 by Anton Sanko
 The Passengers of the Night (2022)

Awards

 2009: BMI Film & TV Awards - Winner, BMI Cable Award, for Big Love 2011: News & Documentary Emmy Award - Winner, Outstanding Individual Achievement in a Craft: Music and Sound, for Great Migrations''

References

External links
 Official web site
 
 

American film score composers
American male film score composers
Living people
Musicians from New York City
Year of birth missing (living people)